2099: World of Tomorrow was a comic book series published by Marvel Comics. The series continued incomplete storylines after all the other Marvel 2099 titles had been cancelled. This included X-Men 2099, Spider-Man 2099, X-Nation 2099, Ghost Rider 2099, Doom 2099 and the Fantastic Four 2099.

Plot
2099: World of Tomorrow brings together many cancelled titles and therefore contains many concurrent plot lines. The overarching storyline takes place in the Savage Land, Latveria, and the Alchemax Ares Colony on Mars. Prior to the start of the title, the polar ice caps have melted, due to a small planetoid entering the atmosphere, which is revealed to be the Phalanx collective. This floods the world, killing 90% of the world's population and driving the last remnants of humanity to higher ground or on large armadas of skiffs drifting in the waters.

As the story begins, Twilight, December and Metalsmith of X-Nation along with Father Jennifer and Ben Grimm crash land on Mars, sent on a mission to Ares Colony to see if it would be feasible to evacuate the remaining Earth population to Mars. Ben is captured before the others awake, a plot hole that is left unresolved before the series is cancelled. The others make it to Ares colony and find that the few remaining native Martians, known to them as Takers, have been constantly stealing their equipment and members of the expedition team. Twilight is abducted by the Takers, but finds out they have been trying to terraform Mars. It is revealed that centuries prior the Phalanx turned Mars into a wasteland and killed the majority of the Takers. Twilight and Metalsmith help them revive the rest of their race from suspended animation and together take off in a spaceship toward the Phalanx planetoid orbiting Earth.

Meanwhile, a large group of humans and mutants have relocated to Humanity's Last Refuge in the Savage Land, including many of the X-Men, the Fantastic Four, Spider-Man and the other members of X-Nation. Bloodhawk, Willow, La Lunatica, Jade Ryuteki, Drew Hodge and Mr. Winn form an exploration team to venture beneath the surface of the Savage Land. There they find an ancient alien craft, nearly being killed by its self-destruct mechanism.

Reed Richards works tirelessly to create the mechanical systems needed for the Refuge to function, all the while working on a large database to store the bulk of humanity's knowledge. He finishes the database, a semi-sentient robot named Franklin, and leaves with Sue and Johnny to return to their own time.

Spider-Man rescues a man from the water who has been infected by the transmode virus. He sets out to find where he came from, unknowingly carrying Uproar and Wulff, who had heard the infected man mention "Wild Boys", the gang that Wulff used to run with. Their ship is destroyed and they are separated. Uproar and Wulff are taken prisoner by Vulture, the leader of the wild boys. Wulff is reverted to a were-wolf form, and together they escape, but soon go their separate ways.

Spider-Man washes up on the shores of Latveria where he is saved by his former lover Xina Kwan. Xina is helping Doom experiment on people with the transmode virus, attempting to find a way to defeat the Phalanx. At the same time, Doom puts up a front, claiming to aid Magus, the Phalanx emissary, in finding the Scout, a Phalanx sleeper that carries the code to assimilate all of Earth. Magus sees through this and reveals that he has known the Scout's location all along. In the Savage Land, Winn reveals himself to be a Phalanx member and captures Nostromo, the Phalanx Scout. He returns to Latveria with Nostromo where he is uplinked to the planetoid and the assimilation begins.

The stories all converge as the Phalanx begins its assault. Twilight, Smith and the Takers crash their ship into the planetoid, where they begin battling the Phalanx forces. Doom initiates a subroutine in Nostromo that he had cultivated, knowing of the scout program since the Phalanx invasion of the 20th century. This code disconnects Nostromo and severs the connection to the collective. As Spider-Man escapes with Nostromo, Doom gives his life to destroy Magus and the other Phalanx forces in Latveria. Meanwhile, Franklin uplinks to the collective and asks them their purpose. When they respond that they plan to destroy the human race he labels them as "evil" and sets the planetoid to self-destruct, killing the Takers, Twilight and Smith as well.

With the Phalanx threat avoided, the survivors in the Savage Land begin to build the first living quarters. Spider-Man leaves Latveria to find his missing brother. Doom's will names Nostromo the heir to his throne in Latveria. The book ends after 8 issues.

One last sub-plot begins, but is never resolved. Mlle. Strange, the new sorceress supreme ventures below the surface of the Savage Land where she battles Garokk the petrified man. Garokk transferred his petrified composition to Strange and was again flesh and blood, claiming the title of Sorcerer supreme. What becomes of them is never explained.

After this the Earth-928 imprint of 2099 was concluded by the 2099: Manifest Destiny one-shot in March 1998.

References

1996 comics debuts
Comics by Joe Kelly (comics writer)
Marvel 2099 titles